Currently there are 124 properties listed on the National Register of Historic Places in Central Chicago, out of more than 350 listings in the City of Chicago. Central Chicago includes 3 of the 77 well-defined community areas of Chicago: the historic business and cultural center of Chicago known as the Loop, as well as the Near North Side and the Near South Side. The combined area is bounded by Lake Michigan on the east, the Chicago River on the west, North Avenue (1600 N.) on the north, and 26th Street (2600 S.) on the south. This area runs five and one-quarter miles from north to south and about one and one-half miles from east to west.

The Chicago central city area includes many early classic skyscrapers of the Chicago School of Architecture, such as Burnham and Root's Monadnock and the Reliance Buildings, as well as buildings from the early Modernist period, such as Ludwig Mies van der Rohe's IBM Building and 860–880 Lake Shore Drive Apartments. Chicago's earliest surviving building, the Henry B. Clarke House is on the Near South Side, close to the Prairie Avenue District, which many critics view as the jewel of residential Chicago architecture. Architect Louis Sullivan's work is represented by the Carson, Pirie, Scott and Company Building, and Auditorium Building. Though Frank Lloyd Wright worked downtown first as an assistant to Sullivan (including work on the Auditorium and James Charnley House) and then in his own firm - his major remaining work in the central city is represented only by his well regarded renovation of the lobby of the Root and Burnham's Rookery Building.

At least three sites relate to the city's role in nationwide retailing.  Included also are several religious buildings, six hotels, and four theaters.

Current listings

|}

Former listing

|}

See also
List of Chicago Landmarks (the historic places listed as Chicago Landmarks are protected by city ordinance)
National Register of Historic Places listings in Cook County, Illinois
List of National Historic Landmarks in Illinois
National Register of Historic Places listings in North Side Chicago
National Register of Historic Places listings in South Side Chicago
National Register of Historic Places listings in West Side Chicago

References

External links
Chicago Listing on the National Register of Historic Places, August 5, 2011, City of Chicago, Rahm Emanuel, Mayor.
NPS Focus database, National Park Service.

Chicago-related lists
Central